Lucien Lecointe (14 April 1867 - 22 June 1940) was a French politician. He served as a member of the Chamber of Deputies from 1909 to 1919, 1924 to 1928, and 1932 to 1936, representing Somme. He was also the mayor of Amiens from 1925 to 1940.

References

1867 births
1940 deaths
People from Amiens
French Section of the Workers' International politicians
Members of the 9th Chamber of Deputies of the French Third Republic
Members of the 10th Chamber of Deputies of the French Third Republic
Members of the 11th Chamber of Deputies of the French Third Republic
Members of the 13th Chamber of Deputies of the French Third Republic
Members of the 15th Chamber of Deputies of the French Third Republic
Mayors of places in Hauts-de-France